The fifth season of the television series, Law & Order: Special Victims Unit premiered September 23, 2003, and ended May 18, 2004, on NBC. Law & Order: SVU moved away from its Friday night slot to Tuesday nights at 10pm/9c. Casey Novak, the unit's longest-serving ADA, was introduced in the fifth episode when Diane Neal joined the cast to fill the absence left by Stephanie March.

Production
Early reports about Stephanie March leaving the cast at the end of Season 4 indicate that the first Season 5 episodes were written if not filmed by May 2003.

The sixth episode, "Coerced", shows Elliot Stabler and George Huang at odds with each other about how to get through to a schizophrenic man. Jonathan Greene, who wrote the episode, said that Neal Baer has "instilled in all of us this fascination with how the mind works, and the nexus of where the mind and the law cross." 

During a 2012 interview for the show Media Mayhem, Neal Baer revealed that the most controversial episode of his career came from the fifth season. About the episode "Home", he said "I never ever dreamed that I would get so much hate mail" and explained "children who go to private or public schools are seen by lots of people and that's a safety net." 

The nineteenth episode, "Sick", was loosely based on the allegations of child abuse against Michael Jackson. Writer Dawn DeNoon disagreed with verdict in Jackson trial so decided to write a show based on her perception and said "Justice wasn't done in the real arena, so I kept closer to the true story in this one than in most of them." 

In the real-life case to which DeNoon refers, the evidence that was not introduced in the 2005 trial was introduced in the two 1994 grand jury hearings after the civil settlement for the civil case. Both grand juries disbanded after several weeks and did not indict Jackson, claiming the evidence did not match the accuser's description and citing lack of other evidence.

During the filming of the fifth season, SVU still did not have its own courtroom set. A 2011 video with Diane Neal reveals that the directors were still using the Law & Order courtroom. She reminisced "my memories of this set are of waking up at the ass-crack of dawn on a Saturday when they weren't using it and shooting courtroom for twenty-two hours."

Cast changes and returning characters
Stephanie March (ADA Alexandra Cabot) departed the cast after the fourth episode, her character "killed" and placed into the witness protection program. The last-minute twist of having her character survive was confirmed as a way of letting her character make further appearances. Christopher Meloni joked that "Dick Wolf always has an aversion to whacking his own people. He gives them a door, not a bullet. Unlike The Sopranos, where you're lucky if you leave with your head on." 

Diane Neal (who previously guest-starred in the 10th episode of Season 3, "Ridicule", as a female rapist) joined the cast afterward as Casey Novak, a more hands-on and by-the-book ADA than Alex Cabot. In an email interview, Neal wrote "I had no idea whether or not I'd performed well in the audition, but I was lucky enough to get the part." When describing her character, Neal said, "I always walked like I was uncomfortable in heels, therefore so did Novak."

Mike Doyle began portraying CSU forensics technician Ryan O'Halloran with the episode "Choice", a recurring character he portrayed for the next five seasons. Even though a backstory for O'Halloran was not firmly established during the fifth season, Doyle stated that "they used to write for O'Halloran as if he were from the Midwest." 

Additionally, Judge Joseph Terhune was introduced, played by Philip Bosco, who guest-starred as a Parkinson's patient in the previous season. The episode "Bound" reveals that his character likes to host poker games and features a scene in which most of the judge characters in SVU are seated at the poker table.

Cast

Main cast
 Christopher Meloni as Senior Detective Elliot Stabler
 Mariska Hargitay as Junior Detective Olivia Benson
 Richard Belzer as Senior Detective John Munch
 Stephanie March as Assistant District Attorney Alexandra Cabot (episodes 1–4)
 Diane Neal as Assistant District Attorney Casey Novak (episodes 5–25)
 Ice-T as Junior Detective Odafin "Fin" Tutuola
 BD Wong as FBI Special Agent Dr. George Huang
 Dann Florek as Captain Donald "Don" Cragen

Crossover stars
 Fred Dalton Thompson as District Attorney Arthur Branch (Crossing over with Law & Order)

Recurring cast

 Beverly D'Angelo as Defense Attorney Rebecca Balthus
 Ian Bedford as Officer Bamford
 Stephen Gregory as Dr. Kyle Beresford
 Peter McRobbie as Judge Walter Bradley
 Jim Titus as Officer Marvin Bryson
 Marlo Thomas as Judge Mary Clark
 Jill Marie Lawrence as Defense Attorney Cleo Conrad
 Triney Sandoval as Technical Assistance Response Unit Technician Echevarria
 Barry Bostwick as Defense Attorney Oliver Gates
 David Thornton as Defense Attorney Lionel Granger
 Pilar Witherspoon as Julia Hynton
 Ned Eisenberg as Defense Attorney Roger Kressler
 Peter Hermann as Defense Attorney Trevor Langan
 Sheila Tousey as Judge Danielle Larsen
 Joselin Reyes as Paramedic Martinez
 Joel de la Fuente as Technical Assistance Response Unit Technician Ruben Morales
 John Cullum as Defense Attorney Barry Moredock
 Julia White as Dr. Anne Morella

 Mike Doyle as Crime Scene Unit Forensics Technician Ryan O'Halloran
 Charlayne Woodard as Sister Peg
 Joanna Merlin as Judge Lena Petrovsky
 Audrie J. Neenan as Judge Lois Preston
 Donnetta Lavinia Grays as Officer Ramirez
 Harvey Atkin as Judge Alan Ridenour
 Michael Boatman as Defense Attorney Dave Seaver
 Caren Browning as Crime Scene Unit Captain Judith Siper
 Tom O'Rourke as Judge Mark Seligman
 Linda Emond as Dr. Emily Sopher
 Callie Thorne as Defense Attorney Nikki Staines
 Philip Bosco as Judge Joseph Terhune
 Daniel Sunjata as Crime Scene Unit Forensics Technician Burt Trevor
 Tamara Tunie as Medical Examiner Dr. Melinda Warner
 Craig Wroe as Defense Attorney James Woodrow
 William Whitehead as Judge Philip Wyler
 Peter Riegert as Defense Attorney Chauncey Zeirko
 Sullivan Walker as Martin Bosa

Guest stars

The season opener "Tragedy" featured Shirley Knight who also starred in the premiere of the third season. Her character was Rose Granville, a wealthy mother determined to harm anyone who stands in her daughter's way of success. Mare Winningham was one of two fifth season nominees for the Primetime Emmy Award for Outstanding Guest Actress in a Drama Series. She played the mother of a hyperactive boy who takes the wrong medication and commits a heinous crime as a result. The second was Marlee Matlin for the nineteenth episode "Painless" in which she played assisted suicide advocate Dr. Amy Solwey. Here character shares an emotional scene with Detective Munch during which it is revealed that Munch's father killed himself. This is also true of Richard Belzer's father. Matlin commented that "I remember Richard having a hard time with it at first. I figured there must have been some personal connection there and I believe he told me afterwards."

The episode "Coerced" is about a schizophrenic man trying to reach out to his son. Leland Orser played the father and Spencer List played the son. In a 2012 Twitter interview, List wrote "I became an actor when I was 5 I did a [Law & Order: SVU] and I knew from then on I wanted to do this for the rest of my life." The episode "Choice" sought to raise awareness about fetal alcohol syndrome. Josie Bissett (whose husband Rob Estes appeared in the previous season) played the role of an irresponsible mother. Katherine Roberts played her daughter and was chosen because she has FAS in real life.

In the episode "Abomination", George Segal portrayed a father in denial about the fact that his son is gay. The accuracy of this episode garnered approval from critics of the ex-gay movement. In the 100th episode "Control", Mariska Hargitay's father, Mickey Hargitay guest starred as a man on a subway station escalator who witnesses the aftermath of a brutal assault. This was Mickey Hargitay's final acting role before his death in September 2006. Cynthia Ettinger guest starred in "Shaken" as a mother whose daughter falls into a coma because of a bad decision she made. Christopher Meloni and Dann Florek were both moved by the episode with Florek saying "it was some of the most emotional stuff Chris has done."

In "Home", Diane Venora portrayed an abusive mother who uses homeschooling as a way of keeping her children from the eyes of the public. When discussing her role, Neal Baer said "She played it, I mean she was ferocious." The episode "Lowdown" guest starred Michael Beach as a black man who infects his wife with AIDS. His character participates in the down low phenomenon of living a double life as a homosexual. After explaining to the squad what that means, Detective Tutuola adds "Don't look at me, I just know stuff." This line was written by Ice-T because, in his words, "at the end of the day, I'm like, 'How do I know so much damn information about this?'" Michael Beach previously played an AIDS patient in ER who was intended to have been on the down low. However, this detail was cut from the episode. "Lowdown" has been referenced in news articles about homophobia in the black community.

In the twenty-first episode "Criminal" James McDaniel portrayed Javier Vega, an ex-convict who has a history with Captain Cragen. Coincidentally, a character played by McDaniel appeared with Cragen in the "Mushrooms" episode of the original Law & Order. Even though he did not play Vega, Florek has stated that this is one of his favourite episodes. The season finale "Head" starred Stacy Edwards as a school principal who becomes pregnant with the child of her student portrayed by Jake Weary. Matt Loguercio, who played a teacher in the episode wrote at length about how he had been auditioning for all three Law & Order when he got the call to appear. He stayed up to date on auditions by taking a classes taught by Jonathan Strauss and Jennifer Jones. Jones was the assistant casting director for SVU at the time and Strauss became the casting director after Julie Tucker departed.

Episodes

References

Bibliography

External links
 Law & Order: Special Victims Unit Season 5 at TVGuide.com
Law & Order: Special Victims Unit Season 5 - TV IV
 Season 5 episodes at IMDb.com

05
2003 American television seasons
2004 American television seasons